Dudhivare is a village in Mawal taluka of Pune district in the state of Maharashtra, India.

Administration
The village is administrated by a sarpanch, an elected representative who leads a gram panchayat. In 2019, the village was not itself listed as a seat of a gram panchayat, meaning that the local administration was shared with one or more other villages.

Demographics
At the 2011 Census of India, the village comprised 75 households. The population of 370 was split between 189 males and 181 females.

Air travel connectivity 
The closest airport to the village is Pune Airport.

See also
List of villages in Mawal taluka

References

Villages in Mawal taluka